USS LSM-462 was a  in the United States Navy during World War II. She was later sold to South Korean Navy as ROKS Gadeok (LSM-605).

Construction and career 
LSM-462 was laid down on 13 January 1945 at Brown Shipbuilding Co., Houston, Texas. Launched on 3 February 1945 and commissioned on 4 March 1945.

Service in the United States 
During World War II, LSM-462 was assigned to the Asiatic-Pacific theater. She was assigned to occupation service in the Far East from 28 September to 15 November 1945 and 16 December 1945 to 5 February 1946.

LSM-462 was decommissioned on 16 February 1955 and loaned to South Korea on the same day.

She was struck from the Navy Register.

Service in South Korea 
ROKS Gadeok was acquired by the South Korean Navy on 16 February 1956 and was commissioned on the same day.

Later in her service, she was designated as LSM-653.

She participated in the Team Spirit 1982.

She was decommissioned on 31 March 1997 and her fate is unknown.

Awards 
LST-462 have earned the following awards:

American Campaign Medal
China Service Medal
Asiatic-Pacific Campaign Medal 
World War II Victory Medal
Navy Occupation Service Medal (with Asia clasp)

Citations

Sources 
 
 
 
 

World War II amphibious warfare vessels of the United States
Ships built in Houston
1945 ships
LSM-1-class landing ships medium
Ships transferred from the United States Navy to the Republic of Korea Navy